Night of the Animated Dead is a 2021 American adult animated zombie horror film directed by Jason Axinn and featuring the voices of Josh Duhamel, Dulé Hill, Katharine Isabelle, James Roday Rodriguez, Katee Sackhoff, Will Sasso, Jimmi Simpson and Nancy Travis.  It is an adaptation of the 1968 George A. Romero film Night of the Living Dead.

Plot
John and his sister Barbara drive to a Pennsylvania cemetery to visit their father’s grave. Unbeknownst to the siblings, an undead outbreak causes corpses to reanimate across the country at the same time. A zombie in the cemetery attacks and kills John. Barbara flees to a nearby farmhouse but finds a woman who lived there dead and half-eaten. Ben, another survivor seeking shelter from the growing zombie horde, joins Barbara in the house. He explains that he came across a radio broadcast from an abandon truck parked at Beekman's diner earlier reporting violent incident around the country and witnessed a propane truck being attacked by zombies and crashed into a gas station which caught on fire, killing the driver trapped inside, and attracting more zombies coming from the diner with the some of the zombies at the gas station were burned in the fire while others stayed away from the flames. The zombies are afraid of fire and light. With Barbara in a state of catatonic shock, Ben fights off zombies with a torch and a lever action rifle and begins boarding up the windows by himself. Ben and Barbara discover cowardly Harry Cooper hiding in the cellar with his wife Helen and their injured daughter Karen along with a young man named Tom and Tom’s girlfriend Judy. Harry, Karen and Helen were traveling when they were attacked by the zombies that overturned their car and Karen was bitten in the arm. They cross paths with Tom and Judy and hid in the farmhouse. Animosity forms when Ben asks for help fortifying the house while Harry insists on everyone bunkering in the cellar instead. A TV news bulletin suggests the undead outbreak may have been caused by radiation from a probe returning from Venus. The TV and radio news reports of a wave of mass murder being committed across the east coast of the United States by an army of cannibalistic, reanimating corpses, and posses of armed men patrolling the countryside to kill the ghouls. They confirm that the ghouls can be stopped with a bullet or heavy blow to the head or by being burned, as Ben discovered, and that various rescue centers are offering refuge and safety.

The men devise an escape plan that involves gassing up at a nearby pump so they can flee in the truck Ben arrived in. Tom and Judy drive the truck while Ben uses a torch to ward off zombies from the back. At the pump, a spill causes the truck to catch fire. The engine explodes. Shrapnel kills Tom and Judy. Ben fights his way back to the house, but Harry refuses to let him inside. Ben breaks in anyway and beats Harry to the floor. Another TV news report shows Sheriff McClelland organizing posses to hunt and kill the undead ghouls.

Zombies besiege the farmhouse. Ben shoots Harry in his stomach during the melee. Ben stumbles down to the cellar. Helen soon follows only to find their daughter Karen eating Harry’s corpse. Karen then stabs her mother to death with a gardening trowel. The zombie horde pulls Barbara outside. With the house now overrun, Ben bunkers in the basement. Harry’s mutilated corpse reanimates, but Ben shoots it in the head and then shoots a dead but not yet reanimated Helen in the head as a precaution.

In the morning, Sheriff McClelland’s men arrive outside and they begin dispatching zombies. Hearing the gunshots, Ben goes back upstairs and toward a window to investigate. Mistaking him for a zombie, Sheriff McClelland directs a man named Vince to shoot Ben in the head. Ben’s body is then dragged to a pile of executed zombies that the posse sets on fire.

Voice cast
Josh Duhamel as Harry Cooper
Katee Sackhoff as Judy
Dulé Hill as Ben
Katharine Isabelle as Barbara
James Roday Rodriguez as Tom
Nancy Travis as Helen Cooper
Will Sasso as Sheriff McClelland
Jimmi Simpson as Johnny
 Ashley Lambert as Karen Cooper
 Stefan Marks as Vince
 Ian Duncan as Dr. Grimes

Release
The film was released in digital platforms on September 21, 2021 and on DVD and Blu-ray October 5, 2021.

Reception
The film has a 25 percent rating on Rotten Tomatoes based on eight reviews.

Rosie Knight of IGN gave the film a negative review and wrote, "...sadly, it does absolutely nothing to justify its own existence. Instead, it's a tired retread that weakens the impact of the original without adding anything of value including, most importantly, good animation."

References

External links
 
 

2021 animated films
American adult animated films
Animated film remakes
Films set in abandoned houses
Films set on farms
Night of the Living Dead (film series)
Siege films
Warner Bros. Animation animated films
Warner Bros. direct-to-video animated films
2020s English-language films
2020s American films